Tsepo Ndwandwa (born 16 April 1995) is a South African cricketer. He made his Twenty20 debut for Border against KwaZulu-Natal Inland on 6 March 2016. He made his first-class debut for Border in the 2015–16 Sunfoil 3-Day Cup on 18 February 2016. He made his List A debut for Border in the 2016–17 CSA Provincial One-Day Challenge on 30 October 2016. In April 2021, he was named in Eastern Province's squad, ahead of the 2021–22 cricket season in South Africa.

References

External links
 

1995 births
Living people
South African cricketers
Border cricketers
Cricketers from Port Elizabeth